Strawberry Shortcake is an American direct-to-video animated series produced by DIC Entertainment Corporation and American Greetings based on the franchise of the same name that debuted in March 2003. The series consists of 45 episodes, plus one short and one movie. Part of the series was broadcast on television including by CBS, HBO, and HBO Family, and in broadcast syndication. None of the voice actors from the 1980s Strawberry Shortcake animated specials returned to reprise their roles, with producers instead opting for younger and lesser known voice actors.

To coincide with the series' reboot in 2009, the 2003 series was succeeded by Strawberry Shortcake's Berry Bitty Adventures in 2010.

Release information

Home Video
20th Century Fox Home Entertainment began releasing the series direct-to-video in the United States beginning in March 2003. The first few episodes were released on both DVD and VHS, and bundled with certain toys; later episodes are DVD-only. They are also available on VideoCD through various fourth party licensees in South-East Asia and in certain other markets. The first four videos contain only one story but run for twice the length of subsequent episodes.

From Season 2 onwards, the DVDs and VHS's are presented as "compilations" in which Strawberry recounts the featured adventures using her "remembering book" or for Season 4, showcases the featured stories as simple flashbacks.

22 Volumes (1 including the movie) have been released for the series overall.

Television

United States
In the United States, although promoted as a direct-to-video series, the series did air on television as well.

In late-2003, Season 1 gained one-off airings on HBO and HBO Family.

In September 2006, shortened Season 1 and Season 2 episodes aired on Mondays within the Program B slot (which mainly aired on The CW affiliates) of the DIC Kids Network Syndicated block. It would then gain a slot on the KEWLopolis block on CBS in September 2007, with the addition of Season 3 episodes. Season 4 has never aired on television in the United States and remains exclusively on DVD and digital download.

On June 20, 2005 Toon Disney Premiered Strawberry Shortcake and on Disney XD and Disney Channel. "Strawberry Shortcake" Is Also Airing on Cartoon Network, Disney XD on Disney Channel, TeleXitos, Toonami, Jetix on ABC Family/ABC, Toon Disney/Disney XD & Disney XD on Disney Channel

Internationally
In international markets, DIC pre-sold the series to GMTV in the United Kingdom and Fox Kids Europe in some European territories in 2004. In 2008, DIC pre-sold the series to more broadcasters including M6, Canal J and Tiji in France, Tiny Pop in the United Kingdom, K-T.V. in South Africa, KiKa in Germany, Austria, Luxembourg and German-speaking Switzerland, and Mediaset in Italy. Season 1 episodes are broadcast as two parts instead of being shortened, doubling the episode count to eight. In Canada, the series aired on Treehouse TV. & Also Aired on Jetix on Family Channel and Others

From Season 2 onwards, the episodes are presented individually on the TV broadcasts rather than being compilations, although this depended on the broadcaster (e.g., Disney Channel Asia aired the first four episodes as two-parters).

Some networks, like GMTV and Minimax in CEE aired Season 1 uninterrupted as one, full-length part akin to the DVD releases, while Season 2 onwards are broadcast exactly like on the DVDs with the compilation format.

Shorts and PSAs
A five-minute Strawberry Shortcake short, "Growing Better All the Time", is available exclusively in the Care Bears: Daydreams DVD (released on October 14, 2003) as a bonus feature. Numerous scenes from the short were used in the 2000s (decade) series' second opening sequence, and the song from the short was released on the "Strawberry Jams" CD.

Apart from that, a Public Service Announcement for the ASPCA was produced and aired in the US. The PSA features Strawberry Shortcake talking about the basics of pet ownership.

Cast

Episodes

Game Boy Advance Video
Majesco has also released Strawberry Shortcake episodes as a Game Boy Advance Video cartridge:
Strawberry Shortcake Volume 1
Meet Strawberry Shortcake
Spring for Strawberry Shortcake
Note: The episodes released on Game Boy Advance Video are the 22-minute edited broadcast version of the episodes (some markets show these episodes as a two-part series without cutting off scenes instead), unlike the video versions which are 45 minutes in length each. Presumably this decision was made to keep the costs of producing the cartridges down (as the need for higher density memory chips would drive the cost of the cartridge up). As a result, two songs and a significant number of scenes from "Meet Strawberry Shortcake", as well as two songs and half of the scenes from "Spring for Strawberry Shortcake" were missing from the GBA Video release if compared to the other videos. Also notable is that the song Friendship Grows Like a Flower was shortened.

Notes

References

External links 
 

2000s American animated television series
2003 American television series debuts
2008 American television series endings
Strawberry Shortcake
American children's animated adventure television series
American children's animated education television series
American children's animated musical television series
Television series by DIC Entertainment
Television series by DHX Media
CBS original programming
First-run syndicated television programs in the United States
Television shows based on Hasbro toys
English-language television shows